L'Amour à la folie (Love to madness) is an 1869 sculpture by Jean-Baptiste Carpeaux, part of the sculptural group La Danse for the Paris Opéra Garnier. The sculpture was commissioned by the building's architect Charles Garnier.
The Musée d'Orsay in Paris holds a terracotta edition (RF 2928), the Museo Soumaya in Mexico City holds both a terracotta and a bronze (Inv.° 274) and the Museu Calouste Gulbenkian in Lisbon holds an edition in marble (Inv.° 563).

Henry James wrote of the sculpture group in The New York Tribune in 1875:

References

1869 sculptures
sculptures in France